The Reformation Memorial (Danish: Reformationsmonumentet) is a memorial to the Reformation of Denmark located on Bispetorv in central Copenhagen, Denmark.

History
A committee chaired by bishop Hans Fuglsang-Damgaard was set up in 1936 in connection with the 400 years' anniversary of Denmark's transition from Catholicism to the Evangelical-Lutheran faith. The sculptor  Max Andersen and the architect Harald Lønborg-Jensen was charged with the design of the monument. It was unveiled on 5 June 1943.

Design
The monument consists of an obelisk featuring a bronze relief on each of its four sides. The relief on the front side depicts the event on Gammeltorv in Copenhagen on 30 October 1536 when Christian III confirmed the Reformation of Denmark. The relief on the left hand side depicts the interruption of Hans Tavsen's service in Greyfriars Church in Viborg by a group of armed men who comes for his arrest. The relief on the rear side depicts the ordination of the first eight Evangelical-Lutheran bishops in Church of Our Lady on 2 September 1537. The relief on the right hand side depicts Peder Palladius' first service after the Reformation. Inscriptions on the granite steps below the reliefs provides information about the subjects:

See also
 List of public art in Copenhagen

References

External links
 {http://www.vanderkrogt.net/statues/object.php?webpage=ST&record=dk108 Photos of the four reliefs]

Monuments and memorials in Copenhagen
1943 establishments in Denmark
Reliefs in Copenhagen